Gopi Sonkar (born 10 April 2000), also known as Gopi Kumar, is an Indian field hockey player and a member of Indian field hockey team. He represented India in 2018 Sultan of Johor Cup held at Malaysia.

He also participated in 9th Hockey India Junior Men National Championship 2019 (Div ‘A’) held at the Sports Authority of India, Western Training Centre, Aurangabad

Early life and career 
He started training at Vivek Singh Academy, then joined Saifai Sports Hostel where his maternal uncle Rajesh trained him. He is the elder between two sisters and three brothers. His father Pyarelal Sonkar used to sell fruits at Pandeypur Chowk.

References 

Indian male field hockey players
Living people
People from Uttar Pradesh
2000 births